Miss Universe Malaysia 2020, the 54th edition of the Miss Universe Malaysia, was held on 5 September 2020 at Kota Damansara, Petaling Jaya, Selangor. Francisca Luhong James of Sarawak was crowned by the outgoing titleholder, Shweta Sekhon of Kuala Lumpur at the end of the event. She represents Malaysia at Miss Universe 2020 pageant held in Hollywood, Florida, United States.

Background

Gala Night 
The Miss Universe Malaysia was originally to be held on April 16, 2020 but on March 16, 2020, every events in Malaysia have to be cancel (or postponed) due to the disease transmission of COVID-19. 

In early July, it was announced that the gala night will be held on September 5 in the form of "e-Gala" with no audience present physically during the event due to the COVID-19 pandemic and social distancing. The e-Gala will be the first-ever virtual Miss Universe Malaysia gala and will be broadcast live on the official website of Miss Universe Malaysia. During the livestream, audiences get to vote for the Miss Body Beautiful, Best in Evening Gown and the winner of Miss Universe Malaysia.

e-Gala Night Judges 

 Dato' Hans Isaac - actor, director and producer.
Datin Selwinder Kaur - Glojas by Smart International Aesthetic chief operating officer.
Dr Nicholas Lim - La Jung Aesthetic Clinic medical director and aesthetic medical practitioner.
Deborah Priya Henry - Miss Universe Malaysia 2011.
Carven Ong - Carven Ong Couture creative designer.
Michelle Lam - Esthetics International Group director.
Shawn Loong - Shawn Cutler Group of Salons founder, creative director and celebrity stylist.
Elizabeth Lee - Bowerhouse co-founder.

Pre-judging Judges 

Marini Ramlan - artist and entrepreneur.
Rubin Khoo - associate publisher at Burda Luxury KL.
Sunita Chhabra - editor of "Life Inspired" at The Star.
Datuk Yasmin Yusoff - Miss Universe Malaysia 1978, actress and singer.
Zahir Kelvin Ong Abdullah - TV host and executive director of Venus Assets Sdn Bhd.

Background 
The public could watch the live-streamed competition by purchasing tickets to the show on the Miss Universe Malaysia website, with 20 per cent of the proceeds to be channeled to Lighthouse Children Welfare Home Association in Kuala Lumpur and Selangor. The winner will also receive a cash prize and sponsored prizes with a combined value of RM 180,000 and a full education scholarship from HELP University.

Final program 
The grand finale was originally scheduled for 5 March 2020, then being delayed from April 2020 and once again to 11 July 2020 before being rescheduled to 5 September 2020. It was originally to be held at The Majestic Hotel Kuala Lumpur, but it was changed to live-streamed virtually at Miss Universe Malaysia website.

Marketing 
The finalists will be featured in an online show, The Next 2020 Miss Universe Malaysia, comprising 18 episodes scheduled to be aired starting January 23, 2020, followed by 10 episodes of their journey leading to the crowning of Miss Universe Malaysia on online lifestyle channel, hurr.tv. The webisodes will also be available on the Miss Universe Malaysia Organization YouTube channel and the hurr.tv mobile app.

Results 

§ Fan favorite winner

Order of announcements 

Top 11

1. Kuala Lumpur - Celine Foo

2. Sabah - Rindsay Laige

3. Selangor - Charissa Chong

4. Johor - Serene Chai

5. Sarawak - Francisca James

6. Kuala Lumpur - Louisa Ananthan

7. Pahang - Quinn Fung

8. Kuala Lumpur - Pritha Manivannan

9. Kuala Lumpur - Chua Xinger

10. Kuala Lumpur - Neha Verma

11. Sabah - Meme Yaw §

Top 4

1. Selangor - Charissa Chong

2. Kuala Lumpur - Neha Verma

3. Sarawak - Francisca James

4. Johor - Serene Chai

Special awards

Contestants 
18 contestants competed for the title of Miss Universe Malaysia 2020:

Crossovers
Contestants who previously competed/appeared at other international/national beauty pageants:

International Pageants

Miss International
2013 - Charissa Chong (Unplaced)

World Miss University 
2014 - Charissa Chong (Top 30)

Miss Asean 
2014 - Charissa Chong (Top 5)

Miss Global Beauty Queen
2017 - Meme Yaw (Unplaced)

 National Pageants
Miss Universe Malaysia
2017 - Meme Yaw (Top 50)

Miss World Malaysia
 2015 - Serene Chai Yong Bin (1st Runner-up)
 2016 - Francisca Luhong James (4th Runner-up) → (2nd Runner-up)
 2018 - Francisca Luhong James (Top 5)

Miss International Malaysia
2013 - Charissa Chong (Winner–Miss International Malaysia)
2017 - Meme Yaw (Winner–Miss Global Beauty Queen Malaysia)

Miss Astro Chinese International
 2016 - Serene Chai Yong Bin (Top 8)

Miss Cultural Harvest Festival
 2015 - Francisca Luhong James (2nd Runner-up)

Supermodel International Malaysia
2017 - Charissa Chong (Top 20)

Miss Malaysia Borneo Tourism
2015 - Meme Yaw (Top 5)

Sabah Model Of The Year
2016 - Meme Yaw (Finalist)

Notes

References

External links 
 
 
 

2020 in Malaysia
2020 beauty pageants
2020
Miss Universe
Events postponed due to the COVID-19 pandemic